Sur-e Tahmasb (also Romanized as Sūr-e Ţahmāsb; also known as Shūr and Sūr) is a village in Khafri Rural District, in the Central District of Sepidan County, Fars Province, Iran. At the 2006 census, its population was 30, in 7 families.

References 

Populated places in Sepidan County